Púbol is a small town located in the municipality of La Pera, in the comarca (county) of Baix Empordà, in the province of Girona, Catalonia, Spain.

The artist Salvador Dalí lived at the Castle of Púbol; in 1982, he was named "Marquis of Dalí of Púbol" (spa., "Marqués de Dalí de Púbol").

In fact Salvador Dalí did not live there, he bought the castle for his wife, Gala, who lived there and granted him to visit her, only when she wanted. After Gala died in 1982 at Púbol where she rests in her crypt, Dalí refused to leave the premises, but he had to be hospitalized, lived at his museum in Figueres for a while and died in a clinic in Barcelona in 1989.

The Castle of Púbol is a museum now. It contains many works of art by Salvador Dalí.

Púbol, along with Cadaqués and Figueres, forms the so-called "Dalinian Triangle".

Populated places in Baix Empordà